Hungarian Civic Party was a political party in Czechoslovakia and Slovakia between 1992 and 1998. It was the party of the Hungarian minority. The party was created as the successor of the Hungarian Civic Initiative, a coalition partner of the former Public Against Violence. In May 1998, the party merged into the newly-formed Party of the Hungarian Coalition.

References

Political parties established in 1992
Political parties disestablished in 1998
Political parties in Czechoslovakia
Defunct political parties in Slovakia
Political parties of minorities in Slovakia
Hungarians in Slovakia
Hungarian minority interests parties